The Institut national de psychiatrie légale Philippe-Pinel is a psychiatric hospital located in Montreal, Quebec for individuals accused of crimes and found to be not criminally responsible due to mental disorder. It is located at 10905 Henri Bourassa Blvd. East in the borough of Rivière-des-Prairies–Pointe-aux-Trembles.

History
The institute was founded in 1970, a time when legal psychiatry was a new science and the government was searching for new methods of managing psychiatric cases that were difficult to treat.

In March 2009, a class action lawsuit against the hospital was settled out of court for $1 million.

Overview
The Pinel Institute rehabilitates patients with both psychiatric and judicial problems. It is affiliated with Université de Montréal and several colleges.

The institute offers external clinical services as well as a program for sexual delinquents. Both men and women are admitted, but men make up a much larger percentage of the total population at the hospital. The danger posed by the patients is determined by consultations with clinician. Over 3,000 books are conserved in its documentation services.

Missions
The four parts of the Pinel Institute's Mission:
 Evaluation of patients
 Education of medical residents and students
 Psychological and biological research on the causes of violence
 Prevention of violence

References

External links
 

Hospital buildings completed in 1970
Psychiatric hospitals in Canada
Teaching hospitals in Canada
Hospitals established in 1970
Prisons in Quebec
Hospitals in Montreal
Université de Montréal
Rivière-des-Prairies–Pointe-aux-Trembles